The following is a list of the 279 communes of the Corrèze department of France.

The communes cooperate in the following intercommunalities (as of 2020):
Communauté d'agglomération du Bassin de Brive
Communauté d'agglomération Tulle Agglo
CC Haute-Corrèze Communauté (partly)
Communauté de communes Midi Corrézien
Communauté de communes du Pays de Lubersac-Pompadour
Communauté de communes du Pays de Saint-Yrieix (partly)
Communauté de communes du Pays d'Uzerche
Communauté de communes de Ventadour - Égletons - Monédières
Communauté de communes Vézère-Monédières-Millesources
Communauté de communes Xaintrie Val'Dordogne

References

Correze